Vladimirs Kamešs (born 28 October 1988) is a Latvian football midfielder playing as a left winger for Norwegian club Elverum and Latvia national football team.

Club career

Early career
Born in Liepāja, as a youth player Kamešs played for his local club Liepājas Metalurgs, coming through all age groups of the academy. In January 2005, at the age of 16, Kamešs was taken to the club's first team. He saw himself scoring in the first and only appearance he made that season, helping his team become the Latvian Higher League champions. Even though, Kamešs helped his team win the Latvian Football Cup in 2006, triumph in the Baltic League in 2007 and become the champions of Latvia once again in 2009, he did not play much. During 5 seasons the young player made only 28 league appearances, scoring 4 goals due to the fact that more experienced players were more likely to be chosen to play over him.

Gulbene-2005
In July 2010 Kamešs was loaned out to the Latvian First League club FB Gulbene-2005 in order to have a chance to play more. Surprisingly, the young player, netted 10 goals in 11 league appearances. He became the club's top scorer, helping them win the Latvian First League championship and clinch a promotion to the Latvian Higher League. Later that year he was also named the best player of the Latvian First League by the Latvian Football Federation.

Return to Liepāja
After the end of his loan spell Kamešs returned to Liepājas Metalurgs to start the upcoming season with them. Evidently, the player had progressed and found himself in the starting line-up all throughout the season. Kamešs scored 11 goals in 29 league matches, becoming the 5th top-scorer of the season. The 2012 season saw Kamešs as one of the club's key players, as he was a constant first eleven player, making 29 league appearances and scoring 10 goals. Even though Metalurgs finished the season in the 4th position, Kamešs was named the best player of the league in October and November. After the season, he was also included in both – sportacentrs.com and LFF teams of the tournament, receiving the awards as the best midfielder of the season and the best player of the season in general.

Amkar Perm
In February 2013 Kamešs went on trial with the Russian Premier League club Amkar Perm. Participating in two of their pre-season training camps, in Turkey and Bulgaria, he signed a two-and-a-half-year deal with them on 18 February. He chose to play with the no. 15 jersey.

Pogoń Szczecin
In February 2015, Kamešs left Amkar Perm by mutual consent, going on to sign for Pogoń Szczecin, which plays in the top tier of Polish football, the Ekstraklasa.

International career
From 2006 to 2010 Vladimirs Kamešs was a member of Latvia U-19 and Latvia U-21. He made his full international debut for Latvia on 22 May 2012 in a 1–0 friendly match loss against Poland, coming on as a substitute in the 73rd minute and replacing Ivans Lukjanovs. He helped his team win the Baltic Cup, taking place in Võru, Estonia from 1 to 3 June 2012. Kamešs scored his first international goal for Latvia on 16 October 2012 in a 2–0 2014 FIFA World Cup qualification victory over Liechtenstein.

International goals

Scores and results list Latvia's goal tally first.

Interesting
Kamešs is on the cover of the 2012 Latvian Higher League year-book published in February 2013.

Honours

Liepājas Metalurgs
 Latvian champion
 2005, 2009
 Latvian Cup winner
 2006
 Baltic League winner
 2007

Gulbene-2005
 Latvian First League champion
 2010

Individual
 Best player of the Latvian First League
 2010
 Best midfielder of the Latvian Higher League
 2012
 Best player of the Latvian Higher League
 2012

National team
 Baltic Cup winner
 2012

References

External links
 
 

1988 births
Sportspeople from Liepāja
Latvian people of Russian descent
Living people
Latvian footballers
Latvia youth international footballers
Latvia under-21 international footballers
Latvia international footballers
Association football midfielders
FK Liepājas Metalurgs players
FB Gulbene players
FC Amkar Perm players
FC Neftekhimik Nizhnekamsk players
Pogoń Szczecin players
FK Liepāja players
FC Yenisey Krasnoyarsk players
FC SKA-Khabarovsk players
Riga FC players
FC Chayka Peschanokopskoye players
Elverum Fotball players
Latvian Higher League players
Russian Premier League players
Russian First League players
Ekstraklasa players
Latvian expatriate footballers
Expatriate footballers in Russia
Latvian expatriate sportspeople in Russia
Expatriate footballers in Poland
Latvian expatriate sportspeople in Poland
Expatriate footballers in Norway
Latvian expatriate sportspeople in Norway